The 68th Air Refueling Squadron is an inactive United States Air Force unit.  It  was last assigned to the 305th Bombardment Wing at Bunker Hill Air Force Base, Indiana, where it was inactivated on 25 March 1965.

The earliest predecessor of the squadron was the 468th Bombardment Squadron, which served as a heavy bombardment training unit until it was disbanded in a reorganization of United States Army Air Forces units in the United States designed to conserve manpower needed in the overseas theaters.

The 68th Air Refueling Squadron served with Strategic Air Command to extend the range of bombers assigned to the command as needed to perform their worldwide mission.  It was discontinued in 1965 and its mission, personnel and equipment were transferred to the 305th Air Refueling Squadron.  In 1985 the two squadrons were consolidated into a single unit, but have not been active since then.

History

World War II

The 468th Bombardment Squadron was activated as a Consolidated B-24 Liberator heavy bombardment squadron in July 1942.  The squadron was part of Second Air Force and served as an operational training unit (OTU).   The OTU program involved the use of an oversized parent unit to provide cadres to "satellite groups".  However, the United States Army Air Forces found that standard military units, based on relatively inflexible tables of organization were proving less well adapted to the mission.  Accordingly, a more functional system was adopted in which each base was organized into a separate numbered unit. The squadron and its parent group were inactivated in 1944 and replaced by the 232d Army Air Forces Base Unit (Development, Heavy) as Dalhart Army Air Field prepared to transition to Boeing B-29 Superfortress training.

Strategic Air Command

The 68th Air Refueling Squadron was activated briefly in 1952 as a Strategic Air Command (SAC) air refueling squadron, but was apparently not manned before being inactivated seven weeks later.  It was reactivated toward the end of 1953 and equipped with Boeing KC-97 Stratofreighter aircraft to support the Boeing B-47 Stratojet medium bombers of the 68th Bombardment Wing.  In September 1957, the squadron moved to Bunker Hill Air Force Base when SAC assumed responsibility for the base from Tactical Air Command.  It was the first operational SAC unit at Bunker Hill.

In 1959 the squadron upgraded to the jet Boeing KC-135 Stratotanker in anticipation of the arrival of the 305th Bombardment Wing at Bunker Hill and the wing's conversion from B-47s to the Convair B-58 Hustler.  The squadron was inactivated in 1965 and replaced by the 305th Air Refueling Squadron, which assumed its mission, personnel, and equipment.

On 19 September 1985 the 68th Air Refueling Squadron was consolidated with the 468th Bombardment Squadron.  The consolidated unit retains the designation of 68th Air Refueling Squadron, Heavy.

Lineage
468th Bombardment Squadron
 Constituted as 468th Bombardment Squadron (Heavy) on 9 July 1942
 Activated on 15 July 1942
 Inactivated on 1 April 1944
 Consolidated with 68th Air Refueling Squadron on 19 September 1985 as the 68th Air Refueling Squadron (remained inactive)

68th Air Refueling Squadron
 Constituted as 68th Air Refueling Squadron, Medium on 7 April 1952
 Activated on 8 April 1952 (not operational)
 Inactivated on 28 May 1952
 Activated 25 November 1953
 Redesignated 68th Air Refueling Squadron, Heavy on 1 June 1959
 Inactivated on 25 March 1965
 Consolidated with 468th Bombardment Squadron on 19 September 1985 (remained inactive)

Assignments
 333d Bombardment Group, 15 July 1942 – 1 April 1944
 68th Strategic Reconnaissance Group, 8 April 1952 – 28 May 1952 (attached to 68th Strategic Reconnaissance Wing)
 68th Bombardment Wing, 25 November 1953 (detached from 14 June 1954 – 7 August 1954)
 4041st Air Base Group, 15 September 1957
 305th Bombardment Wing, 1 June 1959 – 25 March 1965

Stations
 Salt Lake City Army Air Base, Utah, 15 July 1942
 Topeka Army Air Base, Kansas, c. 21 August 1942
 Dalhart Army Air Field, Texas, 22 February 1943 – 1 April 1944
 Lake Charles AFB, Louisiana, 8 April 1952 – 28 May 1952
 Lake Charles AFB, Louisiana, 25 November 1953
 Bunker Hill AFB, Indiana, 3 September 1957 – 25 March 1965

Aircraft
 B-24 Liberator, 1942–1943
 KC-97 Stratofreighter, 1952–1957
 KC-135 Stratotanker, 1959–1965

References

Notes

Bibliography

 
 
 
 

068
Military units and formations established in 1952
068